The South African Police Star for Distinguished Leadership was a high-ranking decoration, that existed between 1979 and 1986. It was reserved for senior police officers, and was awarded only twice.

Instituted on 1 May 1979, the SED was awarded to general officers of the South African Police for distinguished leadership, meritorious service contributing to state security, and outstanding service to heads of state or government.  Both recipients were Commissioners of the SAP.

The SED is a gold Maltese cross with rays between the arms.  In the centre is depicted a stylised aloe plant on a blue-bordered white disc on a gold diamond-shaped plaque.  The reverse has the national coat of arms and the words .

On ceremonial occasions, the SED was worn on a gold collar.  On other occasions, it was worn on a neck ribbon of old-gold, with a white-blue-white centre panel.  There is also a four-pointed multi-rayed breast star.

The SED was discontinued on 1 September 1986.  After that date, police generals were awarded the Order of the Star of South Africa (Non-Military) instead.

See also

 South African civil honours
 South African police decorations

References

 Alexander, E. G. M., Barron G. K. B. and Bateman, A. J. (1986).  South African Orders, Decorations and Medals.  Human and Rousseau.
 Monick, S. (1988).  Awards of the South African Uniformed Public Services 1912-1987.  South African National Museum of Military History.

External links
 South African Medals Website

Law enforcement in South Africa
Police decorations and medals of South Africa
Awards established in 1979
1979 establishments in South Africa
1986 disestablishments in South Africa